The Grand Ducal Guard was the ceremonial guard unit of the military of Luxembourg from 1945 to 1966.

History

Formed in March 1945 the Company of Guards of 120 men were organised into three platoons. The Company mounted its first postwar guard at the Grand Ducal Palace on 12 April 1945. Though it was planned for the Guard to be at battalion strength, it never was larger than a company. From 1947 the company was referred to as the Corps de la Garde Grand-Ducale.

The Corps performed their final Changing of the Guard at the Palace on 29 January 1966 with the Guard being disbanded on 28 February 1966.

Troops of the Army of Luxembourg perform the duty today, with frequently only one guard visible at the palace.

Notes

References
GRAND-DUCHY OF LUXEMBOURG – Virtual Museum Tour

Former guards regiments
Royal guards
Military of Luxembourg
Military units and formations established in 1945
Military units and formations disestablished in 1966
1945 establishments in Luxembourg
1966 disestablishments in Luxembourg